Adam Bin Swandi (born 12 January 1996) is a Singaporean professional footballer who plays as a midfielder for Singapore Premier League club Lion City Sailors and the Singapore national team.

Personal life

Adam was born to father Swandi Kitto and mother Hamidah Dasuki in 1996. His father was a former Singapore international striker in the 1980s. He started training under former Singapore goalkeeper Yaacob Hashim at the age of 4 with boys older than him.

Adam graduated from the Singapore Sports School in 2010.

Beginnings and breakthrough

Youth career

In 2011, during the 23rd edition of the Lion City Cup in Singapore, Adam captained the NFA Under-15 team to 3rd place with victories over Newcastle U-15 and Juventus U-15. Adam then competed at the 2011 AFF U-16 Youth Championship, with the Singapore Under-15 team where they finished 4th, winning the tournament's Fair Play Award as Adam scored 5 goals to finish as top goalscorer. A year later in 2012, Adam and the Singapore Under-16 team finished in 2nd place with wins over Ajax U-15 and Vasco da Gama U-15, and a draw with Porto U-15, before losing eventual to champions Ajax U-15 in the final. Adam subsequently won the Singapore Under-16 Most Valuable Player award. Domestically, the Singapore Under-16 team won the Football Association of Singapore (FAS) U18 COE league with Adam winning the Most Valuable Player award.

In March 2012, Adam was chosen along with Muhaimin Suhaimi and four other students at the Singapore Sports School to undergo a ten-day training camp with the youth team of J.League club Albirex Niigata. Adam was the only one called back for a longer training session in August the same year as their U-18 head coach Nobuhiro Ueno was reportedly impressed by his control and one-touch passing, saying it was better than some of the players at the club's academy.

Club career

FC Metz

On 23 February 2013, Adam signed a two-year contract with Ligue 2 club FC Metz, joining their Under-19 set-up in the Championnat National youth competitions. He had impressed the staff and coaches during his 10-day stint at Metz following his 45-day European tour which includes training spells at illustrious clubs such as Newcastle United, Chelsea and Atlético Madrid. Despite offers of a one-year contract from Spanish club Atlético Madrid and Dutch club AFC Ajax, Adam chose to sign for FC Metz as he liked what he saw and experienced, and was impressed with the quality of its renowned youth academy. The FAS provided financial assistance to the tune of S$200,000 from its Football Development Fund for Adam's education in France.

Adam Swandi was nominally included in the 24-man Courts Young Lions squad which travelled to Turkey for a series of friendly matches in January 2014.

Young Lions
Adam signed for Courts Young Lions for the 2015 S.League season.

Adam scored his first career professional goal in a S.League match in a 1–2 defeat to Warriors FC.

Home United 
Adam moved to Home United FC for the 2017 S.League season after leaving the Young Lions. He made his debut for the Protectors in the first leg of the AFC Cup qualifying match against Phnom Penh Crown FC, and scored his first competitive goal in the second leg, helping his team advance into the group stages. Coincidentally, his second goal came in Home's final game of the 2017 AFC Cup group stage, the last goal in a 4-1 routing of Yadanarbon F.C., sending his team into the zonal semi-finals. In total, Adam made 30 appearances in all competitions in his first season with the Protectors, scoring 7 goals and making 2 assists.

Albirex Niigata Singapore FC

On 8 January 2018, he was announced by Albirex Niigata (S) that they have signed him for the 2018 S.League season. He will be the first Singaporean player to play for the club and will be joined by goalkeeper, Shahul Rayyan after he completes his National Service. He made his debut for Albirex in a 2–1 win in the Singapore Community Shield against Tampines Rovers. Adam ended his first season with the White Swans with 3 winners medal, helping his club sweep all domestic trophies on offer. He was rewarded for his effort and named as the Young Player of the Season.

Home United FC 
After a season with Albirex Niigata (S), Adam decided to rejoin Home United for the 2019 Singapore Premier League season due to the lure of continental football and started in all of the first 12 games of the season for the Protectors and has already equalised his tally of 3 league goals of last season.

Club Statistics

International career

In May 2013 Adam, was called up to the national squad by new Singapore national coach Bernd Stange for friendlies against Myanmar and Laos.

He made his first international appearance aged 17 years and 143 days when he came on as a second-half substitute in place of Indra Sahdan in the friendly against Myanmar on 4 June 2013. His first start came against Laos on 11 October 2013.

Adam earned his first recall into the national team in September 2015 in head coach Bernd Stange's 23-strong Singapore squad to take on Syria in their 2018 World Cup qualifiers but failed to make an appearance. As of December 2017, he remains capped only 5 times for the senior national team. He finally earned his sixth cap in a 13-minute cameo during Singapore's 1–0 win over Indonesia in the ASEAN Football Federation (AFF) Suzuki Cup a year later.

International caps

International goals
Scores and results list Singapore's goal tally first.

U16 International caps

U16 International goals
Scores and results list Singapore's goal tally first.

Honours

Club 
Albirex Niigata Singapore FC
 Singapore Community Shield: 2018
Singapore Premier League: 2018
Singapore Cup: 2018

Home United FC

 Singapore Charity Shield: 2019
Lion City Sailors

 Singapore Premier League: 2021

Individual 

 Singapore Premier League Young Player of the Season: 2018

References

1996 births
Living people
Singaporean footballers
Singapore international footballers
FC Metz players
Singaporean expatriate footballers
Expatriate footballers in France
Singaporean people of Malay descent
Association football forwards
Association football midfielders
Footballers at the 2014 Asian Games
Competitors at the 2017 Southeast Asian Games
Asian Games competitors for Singapore
Lion City Sailors FC players
Southeast Asian Games competitors for Singapore